Marc Cholodenko (born 11 February 1950 in Paris), is a French novelist, translator, poet, screenwriter and dialoguist.

Awards 
Cholodenko won the 1976 Prix Médicis for Les États du désert. He has notably been the male dialoguist of the films by Philippe Garrel since 1988.

Work

Poetry 
 Parcs, Flammarion, 1972
 Le Prince, Flammarion, 1973
 Cent Chants à l’adresse de ses Frères, Flammarion, 1974
 Tombeau de Hölderlin, Hachette/, 1979
 2 Odes, Hachette/P.O.L, 1982
 La Tentation du trajet Rimbaud, Hachette/P.O.L, 1984
 M’éloignant M’en revenant, Sables, 1986
 La Poésie la vie, P.O.L, 1994
 Un Rêve ou un Rêve, P.O.L, 1999
 Imitation, P.O.L, 2002
 Taudis-Autels, P.O.L, 2008
 Filet, P.O.L, 2009
 Puis gris que dilue du rose que brûle le bleu, P.O.L, 2014

Novels 
 Le Roi des fées,  publisher, 1974
 Les États du désert (1976), Flammarion, 1976 - reprint P.O.L, 2011
 Prix Médicis 
 Les Pleurs, Hachette-P.O.L, 1980 - reprint P.O.L, 2014
 Meurtre, Hachette-P.O.L, 1982
 Mordechai Schamz, Hachette-P.O.L, 1984
 Histoire de Vivant Lanon, P.O.L, 1985
 Bela Jai, Salvy, 1989
 Métamorphoses, Julliard, 1991
 Quasi una fantasia, P.O.L, 1996
 Mon héros (Je ne sais pas), P.O.L, 2000
 NYC, P.O.L, 2004
 Thierry, P.O.L, 2006
 Filet, P.O.L, 2009
 Il est mort ?, P.O.L, 2016

Essays 
 Deux cents et quelques commencements ou exercices d'écriture ou de lecture amusants, P.O.L, 2011

Translations 
 J R (J R) novel by William Gaddis, Éditions Plon, series "Feux croisés", 1993
 L'inspectrice (The Tax Inspector) novel by Peter Carey, Plon, series "Feux croisés", 1993
 Les Mystères de Pittsburgh (The Mysteries of Pittsburgh) novel by Michael Chabon, 1994. Reprinted in 2009 in the series "Pavillons Poche" at Éditions Robert Laffont.
 La Traversée du milieu novel by V. S. Naipaul, Plon, series "Feux croisés", 1994
 Écorché vif (Skinned Alive: Stories) novel by Edmund White, Plon, series "Feux croisés", 1997 
 translated with Elisabeth Peellaert
 Mr. Schmidt (About Schmidt) novel by Louis Begley, Editions Grasset, 1997
 Peter Pan est mort (Death Comes for Peter Pan) novel by Joan Brady, Plon, coll. "Feux croisés", 1997
 La Symphonie des adieux (The Farewell Symphony) novel by Edmund White, Plon, series "Feux croisés", 1998
 Les vierges suicidées (The Virgin Suicides) novel by Jeffrey Eugenides, Plon, series "Feux croisés", 1998
 Les chiens-monstres (Lives of the Monster Dogs) novel by Kirsten Bakis, Plon, series "Feux croisés", 1998
 Le dernier acte (A Frolic of His Own) novel by William Gaddis, Plon, series "Feux croisés", 1999
 Le Chant, translation of the Song of Songs, Bayard, 2003
 translated with Michel Berder
 Middlesex (Middlesex), novel by Jeffrey Eugenides, Éditions de l'Olivier, 2003
 Politique (Politics), novel by Adam Thirlwell, Éditions de l'Olivier, 2004 
 Gothique Charpentier (Carpenter's Gothic) novel by William Gaddis, Christian Bourgois publisher, coll. « Titres », 2006

Screenplays and dialogues 
 Les baisers de secours (1989) (scénario)
 J'entends plus la guitare (1991) (dialogues) 
 La Naissance de l'amour (1993) (screenplay)
 Oublie-moi (1994) (screenplay)
  (1996) (dialogues) (screenplay) 
 Le vent de la nuit (1999) (dialogues) 
 L'Île au bout du monde (1999) (screenplay)
 Wild Innocence (2001) (dialogues)
 Regular Lovers (2005) (collaboration to the screenplay) 
 Frontier of the Dawn (2008) (screenplay)
 A Burning Hot Summer (2011) (collaboration to the screenplay)
 Jealousy (2013) (collaboration to the screenplay)

References

External links 
 Marc Cholodenko, on pol-editeur.fr
 Marc Cholodenko on BnF
 

20th-century French writers
20th-century French novelists
20th-century French poets
French screenwriters
French translators
English–French translators
Prix Médicis winners
1950 births
Living people
Writers from Paris